Sanne Hoekstra (born 5 May 1992) is a Dutch handball player. She plays for the club HSG Bensheim/Auerbach and is member of the Dutch national team. She competed at the 2015 World Women's Handball Championship in Denmark.

References

External links

1992 births
Living people
Dutch female handball players
Sportspeople from Amsterdam
Expatriate handball players
Dutch expatriate sportspeople in Germany
21st-century Dutch women